FC Schaan is a Liechtensteiner football team that plays in Schaan. The reserve team is called FC Azzurri Schaan. It is one of the seven official teams in the nation and it plays in the Swiss Football League in 4. Liga, which is the eighth tier. The team annually competes in the Liechtensteiner Cup which was won by the team 3 times in its history. The club runs its youth system in conjunction with FC Vaduz.

Honours 
Liechtenstein Football Cup
Winners (3): 1954–55, 1962–63, 1993–94
Runners-up (11): 1955–56, 1956–57, 1959–60, 1960–61, 1961–62, 1964–65, 1965–66, 1969–70, 1970–71, 1992–93, 2015–16

European record

FC Azzurri Schaan 
FC Azzurri Schaan is the name of FC Schaan's reserve team.

Current squad 

 (captain)

References

External links 
  
 

 
Football clubs in Liechtenstein
Sport in Schaan
Expatriated football clubs
1949 establishments in Liechtenstein